is a train station on the Nankai Main Line in Nagaochō, Sumiyoshi-ku, Osaka, Osaka Prefecture, Japan, operated by the private railway operator Nankai Electric Railway.

Lines
Sumiyoshitaisha Station
Nankai Electric Railway (NK08)
Nankai Main Line
Sumiyoshikōen Station (closed in 2016)
Hankai Tramway (HN11)
Uemachi Line

Sumiyoshikōen Station, opened in 1913, was the terminal of the Uemachi Line. There were approximately 200 trams departing from the station in its peak in circa 1960, but the number of departures was finally reduced to five (four in weekends) at the March 2014 timetable revision to serve 70 to 100 passengers per day. The station, as well as the 200-meter section between Sumiyoshi and Sumiyoshikōen, was closed from 31 January 2016.

Layout

Sumiyoshitaisha Station
Sumiyoshitaisha Station has two island platforms serving two tracks each on the third level. Tracks 2 and 4 are used for sub express trains and airport express trains from January 1 till 3 every year. During the period, station staff tell passengers that trains approaching to Tracks 2 and 4, as automatic announcement system is installed for Tracks 1 and 3 only.

Sumiyoshikoen Station

Sumiyoshikoen Station had two dead-end platforms serving two tracks on the ground.

Adjacent stations

Surrounding area
Sumiyoshi Taisha
Osaka Prefectural Sumiyoshi Park
Sumiyoshi-toriimae Station (HN12, Hankai Tramway Hankai Line)

See also
 List of railway stations in Japan

References

External links
	
	
  
	

Railway stations in Japan opened in 1912
Railway stations in Japan opened in 1913
Railway stations in Osaka Prefecture